Meghan McCarthy is an American screenwriter, lyricist, film and television producer, and creative executive best known as the showrunner of the animated television show My Little Pony: Friendship Is Magic. She is also known for her work on Class of 3000 and Fish Hooks. Since June 2015, she has been the Head of Storytelling for the entire My Little Pony and Littlest Pet Shop brands, helping to "create expansive worlds and characters".

McCarthy was a part of the original Friendship Is Magic crew, and was promoted as showrunner and story editor during season 2 after the departure of series creator and previous showrunner Lauren Faust. Overall, she was directly involved in the writing of 35 episodes, and wrote the lyrics of 25 songs featured in the show; she also wrote the screenplays and lyrics of the spin-off films My Little Pony: Equestria Girls and My Little Pony: Equestria Girls – Rainbow Rocks, and My Little Pony: The Movie.

Career
In October 2010, she was invited by Lauren Faust, the co-creator and producer for Foster's Home for Imaginary Friends, to help write on Hasbro's television revival of its My Little Pony franchise. McCarthy, on a writing hiatus at the time, was inspired to accept by Faust's dedication and the strong female characterization she had presented. In 2011, Faust left the show after the two-part season two premiere, and McCarthy was promoted to co-executive producer for its third season onward; she also served as the show's story editor. In early June 2015, Hasbro promoted McCarthy to become the company's new "Head of Storytelling" for their brands, My Little Pony and Littlest Pet Shop; her role will be to help "create expansive worlds and characters" across these brands, according to Hasbro's executive vice president Stephen Davis.

In addition, McCarthy has written and helped produce the spin-off films, My Little Pony: Equestria Girls and its sequel. She was nominated for a Daytime Emmy for "Outstanding Original Song - Children's and Animation" for her lyrics in the Friendship Is Magic episode "Sweet and Elite".

On November 3, 2017, Hasbro Studios and Paramount extended their relationship with an exclusive five year production deal for Allspark Pictures and Allspark Animation for original and toy based films. Both Allspark units are newly formed (Allspark Pictures formerly was a financing label) with the film unit head by Greg Mooradian and the animation unit head by Meghan McCarthy. Paramount and Hasbro would also work together on TV series. Following Hasbro’s purchase of Entertainment One in 2019, though, Allspark would later close down and be absorbed into the newly-acquired production company.

Filmography

Television

Friendship is Magic detailed writing credits

Film

My Little Pony lyric credits

References

External links
 
 

American television producers
American women film producers
American women screenwriters
American women television writers
Living people
American women television producers
Year of birth missing (living people)